Kulda is a Latvian surname. Individuals with the surname include:

Artūrs Kulda (born 1988), Latvian ice hockey player
Edgars Kulda (born 1994), Latvian ice hockey player

Latvian-language surnames